Grønvatnet is a lake in Skjåk Municipality in Innlandet county, Norway. The mountain lake lies in a low area surrounded by mountains, just west of Vulueggi, north of Krosshø, and south of Tordsnose.

See also
List of lakes in Norway

References

Skjåk
Lakes of Innlandet